Amtssee is a lake in the Schorfheide-Chorin Biosphere Reserve in Brandenburg, Germany. It is located in the municipality of Chorin, Barnim district.

Lakes of Brandenburg
Barnim